Caetextia (from the Latin word caecus, meaning "blind" and contextus, meaning "context") is a term and concept first coined by psychologists Joe Griffin and Ivan Tyrrell to describe a chronic disorder that manifests as a context blindness in people on the autism spectrum. It was specifically used to designate the most dominant manifestation of autistic behavior in higher-functioning individuals. Griffin and Tyrell also suggested that caetextia "is a more accurate and descriptive term for this inability to see how one variable influences another, particularly at the higher end of the spectrum, than the label of 'Asperger's syndrome'".

People with caetextia often experience elevated levels of frustration, anger, and anxiety when faced with a situation that requires giving attention to more than one interacting variable or factor at a time. This can be attributed to the inability to unconsciously draw upon the contextual information presented in a given situation as well as evaluate the significance of change with regards to the surrounding environment.

Caetextia can also exist in a temporary form prompted by stress, anxiety, or depression.

Caetextia in autism and Asperger's 
Many of the symptoms observed in patients with Asperger's can be attributed to caetextia. In order for someone to be considered contextually aware, they must be able to attach attention to and detach it from the interacting variables in a given situation. This implies active integration of sensory information gathered from the situation. It has been found that patients differ in their ability to perform these functions based on the dominant hemisphere of their brain.

Context blindness has been speculated as having a relationship with other prominent neurocognitive theories of Autism spectrum disorder (ASD) such as theory of mind, empathizing–systemizing, and executive function.

See also 
 Perspective-taking

References

Autism